Firangiz Rehimbeyli (6 August 1960 – 16 August 2022) was an Azerbaijani singer and actress.

Biography 
Rehimbeyli was born on 6 August 1960 in the village of Şişpapaqlar, Aghdam District. Her mother Raisa died at a very early age. Her father remarried, this time to Sona, an employee of the Azerbaijan National Academy of Sciences. Rehimbeyli was raised mostly by her stepmother.

In the 1980s she starred on an Azerbaijani television variety show. At the end of the 1980s, Rehimbeyli became one of the founders of modern Azerbaijani pop music. Rehimbeyli worked with composers such as Rafig Babayev, Eldar Mansurov, and Ogtay Kazimov, with songs such as "Əgər məni unutsan", "Bu sevgi", "İnanıram sevgiyə", "Bizim dağlar", "Ana torpaq", "Məhəbbətim gələcək", "Gülə-gülə", "Bəri bax", and "Oğlan". Rehimbeyli was also an actress in a number of films, her biggest success was the role of Sevda in the film "Bəxt üzüyü".

After divorcing her first husband, Rehimbeyli moved to Los Angeles, California, USA with her daughter Raisa in 1993. After moving to America, her daughter changed her name to Rachel. In 1999, Rehimbeyli married American architect Raymond Anthony. Rehimbeyli was engaged in small business and sang in Russian restaurants, mainly in Los Angeles. In 2017, at the invitation of Tahir Imanov, Rehimbeyli came to Baku and reprised her role as Sevda in "Bakht uzyugyu 2".

Rehimbeyli died of a heart attack on 16 August 2022, at the age of 62.

Filmography

Film

References

External links
 

1960 births
2022 deaths
20th-century Azerbaijani women singers
21st-century Azerbaijani women singers
Azerbaijani film actresses
Soviet film actresses
People from Agdam District
Soviet Azerbaijani people
Azerbaijani women pop singers
Azerbaijani women singer-songwriters
Burials at Valley Oaks Memorial Park